Mzingwane High School is a boys-only government secondary school located in the heart of Matebeleland South as it is the Crown of the Province and it is the only school left in Matebeleland South which is a boys' school.  Founded in 1921 in Tsholotsho then moved to Essexvale in 1942 (now Esigodini)  ,45km southeast of Bulawayo, Mzingwane High boards 400+ students.                                                                                                     The School motto is Izenzo kunge Mazwi  meaning Actions Speak Louder Than Words and the badge represents an Elephant. Obadiah Mlilo was Mzingwane's first black principal; he headed the school from 1973 to 1978. Mzingwane has a large alumni base both within the country and in the diaspora. Under the banner of Mzingwane Old Boys Association (MOBA), these alumni have helped in the development of the school. Their project title "replace your chair and desk" is one of MOBA's efforts to assist the school by purchasing new desks and chairs for students.

Sports and clubs 
Mzingwane High under 16 soccer team were champions of the 2012 under 16 national copa-coca-cola cup which was played at Chinotimba stadium in Victoria Falls. This made Mzingwane the first school from Matebeleland South province to win the title. They won US$6 500 and their coach Bekezela Mavundla won a coach of the year accolade. Their goal keeper, Paul Makotore was declared goal keeper of the tournament and voted Africa’s best goal keeper during a camp in South Africa.In 2015 Lwazilwenkosi Mpofu and McKringle Mhlanga were champions of the National Mathematics Olympiad by Old Mutual bringing Gold and Silver Medals home. Since 2015 till today the school have been the Defending Provincial Champions for the Aids Action Quiz (N.A.C.)

Notable alumni 

 Nkululeko Innocent Dube, founder of IYASA
 Mduduzi Mathuthu, editor of The Chronicle
Jason Moyo, founder of the Zimbabwe People's Revolutionary Army
 Elijah Nkala, sprinter
 Lazarus Nkala, revolutionary and political activist

See also

 List of schools in Zimbabwe

References

Exte
1920s establishments in Southern Rhodesia
Boarding schools in Zimbabwe
Boys' schools in Zimbabwe
Boys' high schools in Zimbabwe
Educational institutions established in 1921
Education in Matabeleland South Province
High schools in Zimbabwe
1921 establishments in the British Empire